Thaisella coronata is a species of sea snail, a marine gastropod mollusk, in the family Muricidae, the murex snails or rock snails.

Description
The length of the shell attains 45 mm.

Distribution
This species occurs in the Atlantic Ocean off Brazil.

References

 Claremont, M., Vermeij, G. J., Williams, S. T. & Reid, D. G. (2013). Global phylogeny and new classification of the Rapaninae (Gastropoda: Muricidae), dominant molluscan predators on tropical rocky seashores. Molecular Phylogenetics and Evolution. 66: 91–102.

External links
 Schubert, G. H., & Wagner, J. A. (1829). Neues systematisches Conchylien-Cabinet angefangen von Martini und Chemnitz. Nürnberg, Bauer & Raspe. 12: 1-196

coronata
Gastropods described in 1816